Christian Natterer (born 19 February 1981) is a German politician of the Christian Democratic Union (CDU).

Political career 
Natterer became a member of the German Bundestag as a successor to Armin Schuster in November 2020. He is a member of the Committee on European Union Affairs.

References

External links 

  
 Bundestag biography 

1981 births
Living people
Members of the Bundestag for Baden-Württemberg
Members of the Bundestag 2017–2021
Members of the Bundestag for the Christian Democratic Union of Germany